Pulicaria lanata is a species of flowering plant in the family Asteraceae. It is found only in Yemen. Its natural habitat is subtropical or tropical dry shrubland.

References

lanata
Endemic flora of Socotra
Least concern plants
Taxonomy articles created by Polbot